Isle Of Man was a thoroughbred racehorse known mainly for winning the New Zealand Derby in 1981. He went on to win the 1982 Rosehill Guineas.

References

1978 racehorse births
Racehorses bred in New Zealand
Racehorses trained in New Zealand
Thoroughbred family C2